Kenley is a residential suburb within the London Borough of Croydon. Surrounded by the Metropolitan Green Belt on three sides, it includes the large open spaces of Kenley Common and Kenley Aerodrome. Kenley was part of the ancient parish of Coulsdon in the county of Surrey and was connected to central London by rail in 1856. As the population of the area was growing, it became part of Coulsdon and Purley Urban District in 1915 and has formed part of Greater London since 1965. At the 2011 Census, Kenley had a population of 14,966.

History

Local government
Kenley was a hamlet in the ancient parish Coulsdon in the county of Surrey. In 1894 the Coulsdon parish became part of Croydon Rural District. Responding to the increase in population in the area, the rural district was broken up in 1915 and the parish of Coulsdon became part of Coulsdon and Purley Urban District. Coulsdon and Purley was incorporated into Greater London in 1965 and became part of the London Borough of Croydon.

Suburban development
For centuries, Kenley was part of Coulsdon Manor which covered the whole area now known as Coulsdon, Old Coulsdon, Purley and Kenley. As with most of this area, Kenley was primarily farm land, with a few big houses and their estates.

The official opening of the railway on 4 August 1856 transformed Kenley. The new railway prompted urban development. By the end of the Victorian era, Kenley had assumed its own identity. Magnificent gentlemen's houses in substantial grounds were constructed during the 1860s.  These houses gave Kenley its distinctive appearance on its western hillside.  More modest housing and shops were built along the Godstone Road in the 1880s.  Finally, the compact housing of the lower lying Roke area was constructed toward the end of the 19th century.

All Saints' Church, now a Grade II listed building, was built in 1870, and enlarged in 1897 and 1902. In 1888, Kenley was created as a parish in its own right.

One of Kenley's landmark buildings is the Memorial Hall. It was opened in 1922 to commemorate those who gave their lives in the First World War. It was subsequently extended and re-opened by Group Captain Douglas Bader in 1975.

Second World War
RAF Kenley was a strategic airfield in the Battle of Britain. Given RAF Kenley's importance,  the Luftwaffe attempted to destroy it by means of a massive bombing raid on 18 August 1940. The attacking Luftwaffe aircraft suffered heavy casualties during the raid. Despite some damage to the airfield and the surrounding buildings and homes, this bombing raid proved unsuccessful. By the following day, RAF Kenley was operational again.

Kenley airfield plays a unique and important role in Britain’s history. As the UK’s most complete surviving Battle of Britain fighter airfield, it gives us a direct and tangible link to our aviation past. As an active airfield today, it builds on that heritage, whilst the surrounding environs provide visitors with a site of nature conservation and a protected public open space. The National Lottery funded Kenley Revival Project enables people to connect with, and take ownership of, a vital part of British history.

Hammond Innes' book Attack Alarm was based on his experiences as a Royal Artillery anti-aircraft gunner at RAF Kenley during the Battle of Britain. It contains graphic descriptions of the station and attacks on it in 1940.

Post-war development
In the post-war period, many of the substantial Victorian properties with their extensive grounds were developed for executive housing. In 1959, Kenley was closed as an operational base of the RAF. Today, the aerodrome is used exclusively by the gliders of the Air Training Corps (615 Volunteer Gliding Squadron) and the Surrey Hills Gliding Club.

Geography
It is situated south of Purley, east of Coulsdon and west of Sanderstead. It is almost completely surrounded by the Metropolitan Green Belt, forming part of a finger of urban development that extends into Surrey to include Caterham and Whyteleafe to the south. The south of the area is dominated by the open green spaces of Kenley Common and Kenley Aerodrome.

Kenley Common
Kenley Common comprises 138 acres of green open space surrounding the former Battle of Britain airfield. It is a mixture of chalk grassland and ancient woodland set among gently rolling hills. Blessed with fine views across the Caterham valley and the North Downs beyond, visitors find it hard to believe that the centre of London is only 14 miles to the north.

The original common was bought by the Corporation of London in 1883. At that time, it encompassed some of the area that is now Kenley Airfield. Over the years, compulsory purchases by the Government and subsequent land acquisitions and re-acquisitions have meant that the Common has changed its shape and position, and almost doubled in size.

The common’s history as an airfield goes back to the First World War when planes were assembled and tested for squadrons in France. It proved an important link in the chain of supply and became established as a permanent Royal Air Force station. The Second World War saw concrete runways being laid and, as headquarters of ‘B’ Sector in the No 11 Group of fighter stations, it was soon playing a key role in the Battle of Britain. Kenley is now the last remaining Battle of Britain fighter station in the southeast to remain in its Second World War form. Evidence of its wartime role has survived and the old blast bays, air raid shelters, officer’s mess and the original runways can still be seen. English Heritage identified Kenley as the "most complete fighter airfield associated with the Battle of Britain to have survived".

Demography
In the 2011 census, Kenley was White or White British (76.6%), Asian or Asian British (9.7%), Black or Black British (6.8%), Mixed/multiple ethnic groups (4.8%), and  Other ethnic group (1.2%). The largest single ethnicity is White British (70.3%).

The largest religious groupings are Christians (59.8%), followed by those of no religion (23.4%), no response (7.7%), Hindus (3.8%), Muslims (3.4%), Buddhists (0.7%), other (0.4%), Jews (0.2%) and Sikhs (0.1%).

Politics
Kenley is located within the parliamentary constituency of Croydon South. The incumbent MP is Chris Philp of the Conservative Party, who was re-elected with 30,985 votes in the 2019 general election.

At a local level, Kenley has two Conservative councillors on Croydon Borough Council.

Boundary changes at the 2018 Local Elections saw the number of Councillors reduced from three to two.

Climate

Schools 
 The Hayes Primary School
 The Harris Primary Academy Kenley

Nearest places
Purley
Coulsdon
Caterham
Whyteleafe
Warlingham
Riddlesdown
Sanderstead

Nearest stations
Kenley railway station
Purley railway station
Reedham (Surrey) railway station
Upper Warlingham railway station
Whyteleafe railway station

Notable current or former residents
David Baboulene
Douglas Bader
Peter Cushing
Tommy Eytle
Raza Jaffrey
Cherry Kearton
Des O'Connor
Ray Mears
Ellie Pearce
Karl Popper
Allan Stewart
Harry Worth
Sophie Webber
Kit Connor

References

External links
Kenley Residents' Association
Welcomes & Uplands Roads Association
History of the village of Kenley
 City Of London - Kenley Common information & map
Photos of Kenley and surrounding area on geograph.org.uk
Kenley Airfield Friends Group
Surrey Hills Gliding Club
615 Volunteer Gliding Squadron (Royal Air Force)

Districts of the London Borough of Croydon
Areas of London